Anthony Charles Osmond "Tony" Bedeau  (born 24 March 1979) is a former professional footballer who played as a forward. Born in England, he made four appearances for the Grenada national team.

Career

Torquay United
After being on Chelsea's books as a schoolboy, he joined Torquay United as an apprentice in 1995. He made his debut as a substitute, at the age of 16, on 9 September 1995 against Cardiff City at Ninian Park (a debut described briefly in Garry Nelson's seminal book about life in the lower divisions of English football, Left Foot in the Grave). Signing professional on 28 July 1997, he soon established himself as a first-team regular with his pace and ability attracting attention from Premier League sides, which included him training with Sheffield Wednesday for a spell on the recommendation of Chris Waddle, followed by Torquay turning down a bid of £50,000 from Wednesday.

He started the 2000–01 season with an injury, only managing five goals in a disappointing season all round for the "Gulls". Despite this, he was still in demand from other clubs. In September 2000, Torquay turned down a £200,000 offer from a first division side, thought to be Oxford United, just after he had returned from a week on trial at Sunderland. In December 2000, Rochdale offered £150,000 to Torquay for Bedeau, though he decided against the move.

In May 2001, he agreed to an extension of his contract until 2003. After a poor start to the following season he was transfer-listed, along with fellow forward David Graham, by new manager Roy McFarland and in January 2002 he joined first division Barnsley F.C. on loan  playing three times as a substitute for the Oakwell side. He returned to Torquay, regaining his place in the first team and played a major role in Torquay securing automatic promotion in 2004, playing in a variety of positions. He was awarded a testimonial by the club in the 2005–06 season, finishing the season as the leading goalscorer, before moving to League Two rivals Walsall on 24 May 2006.

Moving clubs
Bedeau struggled to establish himself at Walsall, scoring once against Shrewsbury, and was allowed to join Bury on loan in February 2007. He was transfer listed at the end of the 2006–07 season, and rejoined Torquay United in June 2007 on a 12-month contract. He struggled to reestablish himself at Torquay and was loaned to Weymouth in March 2008. He played nine times for Weymouth, scoring once, against Farsley Celtic, and was released by Torquay at the end of the season.

Kingstonian
On 9 August 2008, Kingstonian announced that they had signed Bedeau on a free transfer. He played in the first four games of the season, scoring once, before his time with Kingstonian was put on hold as he had a number of issues to deal with in Torquay. Bedeau played again for Kingstonian on 5 March 2009.

His last registered club was Kingstonian. Since he left them in 2009, he has been available as a free agent. Bedeau is probably most known best for his long stint with Devon club, Torquay United where he served a number of years as a player.

Honours
Torquay United
 Division 3 third-place and promotion: 2003–04

Walsall
 League Two: 2006–07

External links

References

1979 births
Living people
English sportspeople of Grenadian descent
Grenadian footballers
Footballers from Hammersmith
Association football forwards
Grenada international footballers
English Football League players
National League (English football) players
Torquay United F.C. players
Barnsley F.C. players
Walsall F.C. players
Bury F.C. players
Kingstonian F.C. players